Bharathi Kannamma is a 2019 Indian Tamil language television series aired on Star Vijay and streaming on Disney+ Hotstar. Directed by Praveen Bennett.

Having two seasons, The 1st season of the series premiered on 25 February 2019 and ended on 4 February 2023. It was a remake of the Malayalam series Karuthamuthu. and it stars Roshini Haripriyan as Kannamma (who replaced by Vinusha Devi in 2022) while Arun Prasad as Bharathi. Along with Farina Azad, Roopa Sree, Kanmani Manohar and Akilan S. Pushparaj in the supporting roles. Within a year the series took its generation loop of 8 years was introduced with same cast in addition to, Baby Raksah Shyam and Baby Lisha Rajkumar played Bharathi and Kanamma's twin daughters. 
The story follows Dr. Bharathi (Arun), who loves and marries a girl named Kannamma (Roshni). However, Bharathi's obsessed lover, Dr. Venba (Farina), vows to destroy Bharathi and Kannamma's relationship and marry Bharathi.

6 February 2023, the series completion of 4 years, a spin-off introduced with the same title, premiered on 6 February 2023 starring Sibbu Suryan as Bharathi and Vinusha Devi as Kannamma. Along with Roopa Sree and Deepa Shankar in the supporting roles.

Series overview

Summary 
Kannamma is a pure-hearted girl who is looked down upon by her beautiful stepsister, Anjali, and step-mother, Bhagyalakshmi, due to her dark complexion. Her father however supports and praises her kind nature. Soundarya is a business tycoon who is obsessed with Eurocentric beauty and when Anjali wins the Miss Chennai competition, she arranges a marriage between her and her younger son, Akhilan. Akhilan takes an instant liking to Anjali, but Anjali likes his brother, Bharathi. During this love triangle, Bharathi and Kannamma frequently cross paths, and Bharathi ends up falling for her.

Anjali attempts to blackmail Bharathi into marrying her by threatening suicide, but Bharathi approaches her father to ask his permission to marry Kannamma, and reveals that he is infertile. He then asks him to break the news to Kannamma, and on the condition that she is okay with that, he will marry her. However, Kannamma's father does not tell Kannamma about his infertility, and she consents to the marriage. Kannamma is ecstatic that she will be marrying a good-hearted man. On Anjali's birthday, Bharathi marries Kannamma, enraging both his mother and Anjali. Akhil and Bharathi's father Venu are happy. Soundarya allows Kannamma into the house after insulting her. Anjali marries Akhil and schemes to get rid of Kannamma so that she can divorce Akhil and marry Bharathi, but is thwarted by Soundarya, and later starts to fall in love with Akhil.

Dr. Venba, a coworker madly in love with Bharathi, schemes to break up Bharathi and Kannamma as she wants Bharathi for herself. Kannamma consults with Venba as she is having trouble conceiving, but Venba uses this in her scheme, convincing Bharathi to make it look like she is the reason why they cannot conceive. During a reunion, Varun, a friend of Kannamma, attends, and Venba plants the idea that Kannamma is having an affair with Varun in Bharathi's head.

Having learned that Kannamma is allegedly infertile, Soundarya calls on Bharathi to remarry, with Venba happy that she can be the second wife, but Soundarya wants him to marry someone else. Soon after, Kannamma starts showing symptoms of pregnancy, and later shows a positive pregnancy test to Soundarya, so as to stop her from trying to find Bharathi a new wife. Venba hires a killer, Durga, to kill Kannamma, but the killer later realizes that Kannamma is a good person and he sticks around to stop Venba from trying to kill her and meddle in her life.

It is revealed that Venba killed Bharathi's ex, Hema, and Durga comes clean to Kannamma about his original intentions, but says that Bharathi is the one who wanted her dead and not Venba, as he is in love with Venba. Kannamma attempts to leave the house and reveals to Soundarya that her son is trying to kill her and her baby. The family confronts Bharathi, who says he is not trying to kill her but reveals that he cannot be the father.

Kannamma goes to her parents house and yells at her father for not telling her the truth about his alleged infertility and she leaves. The family tries to get Bharathi to do another fertility test but is stopped by Venba. Kannamma gives birth to twins (Hema and Lakshmi), but Soundarya takes the darker-skinned of the twins unbeknownst to Kannamma, as she wanted to help Kannamma. Soundarya takes the baby home, and saves Bharathi's life by crying which gets him to tend to her, as a chandelier falls. He then takes an interest in the baby and names her Hema, after his ex. Kannamma stays with the nurse, Thulasi. Venba tries to marry Bharathi and almost succeeds but is thwarted by Soundarya.

8 years later 
Lakshmi (Soundharyalakshmi) and Hema are now eight years old and live in a village, where Kannamma runs a tailoring shop. Bharathi and his family arrive at the village to set up a free medical camp, where he ends up meeting Lakshmi, unaware that he is her father. Durga has become a doctor and he poaches both Venba's staff and patients, which angers her. Lakshmi and Hema attend the same school and become close friends. Bharathi grows fond of Lakshmi, unaware that he is her father, and that she is Kannamma's daughter. Bharathi decides to marry Venba in spite of his family's disapproval, but she treats Hema poorly which gives him second thoughts. Kannamma starts a business with Thulasi and Sumathi (her landlord). The twins, unaware that they are twins, are surprised that they share the same birthday and decide to have the birthday at Hema's house, where Bharathi discovers that Kannamma is the mother of Lakshmi. Bharathi decides to go abroad with Hema as he does not like the fact that she has become close with Kannamma. Venba kidnaps Hema in an attempt to stop Bharathi from leaving. Bharathi has Kannamma arrested as he suspects her to be the culprit, but later realizes that she is innocent. He later manages to convince Hema to go to the US and visits Kannamma's house so that she can say her goodbye, and apologizes for having her arrested. Hema learns that her mother's name is Kannamma from the passport forms, and confronts her grandmother. Bharathi tells Hema that her mother is dead to the shock of the rest of the family. Venba kidnaps Durga in order to scare him away.
l
Anjali is diagnosed with a heart ailment while she's pregnant, and is told to think about abortion, but she refuses and hides this issue from the family. Bharathi decides to leave, but Hema has convulsions as they are leaving. When Kannamma visits her, her condition improves and the doctors tells him that in order for Hema to do well, she should stay with Kannamma. Bharathi ends up staying there due to a COVID containment zone for a day.

Bharathi finds out that Lakshmi is Kannamma's daughter when he takes her to the hospital due to a stomach ache. He confronts his family and Kannamma about this. Kannamma discovers that she had given birth to twins and goes on a quest to find the other child. Soundarya does her best to cover up the truth, employing Thulasi in her lies. A baby shower is thrown for Anjali, and Venba and Kannamma are both invited. Venba tries to make it seem like she is married to Bharathi, but Anjali tells Kannamma that they are not married. Later on, Venba discovers the twin situation and threatens Kannamma, and Soundarya overhears this and comes clean. Kannamma takes Hema and Lakshmi to the temple and asks Hema about her mother, when Hema replies that her mother had died when she was born. When Kannamma says that she is her real mother, Soundarya Devi comes and stops her.

Anjali discovers that Hema is Kannamma's daughter, and wants to reunite her with her mother. While visiting Kannamma, Anjali discovers that the medication she was prescribed by Bharati was actually forged. She connects the dots and realizes that this was the doing of Venba. Bharathi starts to feel paranoid that the family is trying to separate him from Hema, and is trying to push him back to Kannamma, so he plans to divorce her.

Kannamma sets up Venba by hiring two women to ask her for an illegal abortion which was filmed and she goes to jail. Venba tells Bharathi that she was framed, and Bharathi files for divorce. During the divorce trial, the judge finds their situation peculiar as they were living apart for eight years but lived life like normal and are co-parenting, so she orders them to live together under one roof for six months. Bharathi stays at Kannamma's house, while the kids are shuttled back to Soundarya's house under the guise that Bharathi is on a business trip. While living with her, he realizes her daily struggles and empathizes with her but he is conflicted as he believes that she cheated on him. Meanwhile, Soundarya hires an attorney named Vadivu to live underneath Kannammas's house with the task of creating situations that draw the couple close to one another. Kannamma opens up to Vadivu about not being ready to be with Bharathi even if the lie has been cleared up as she expects him to apologize to her beforehand. At Hema's home, Lakshmi battles with not knowing who her family is and constantly worries about Kannamma.

Bharathi finally takes a DNA test and learns that Hema and Lakshmi are his daughters. Bharathi finds the true colours of Venba by the help of a returning Durga witnessing Venba's evil act towards Kannamma and the kids in order to get closer to Bharathi.

Bharathi finally apologizes to Kannamma for years of misunderstandings and embarrassments, which Kannamma does not accept. She tells him that he should learn to trust others instead of needing a paper to know the truth about her. Kannamma, at the wishes of Hema and Lakshmi, decide to move to Shenmugam's hometown of Mudhevi to start a new life. Bharathi, with the help of his mother-in-law's brother, successfully tracks them down and opens a hospital as an excuse to be near Kannamma. Kannamma proceeds with her divorce petition and both of them get mutually divorced. Bharathi then tries to convince Kannamma to take him back.  The village chief's son Pandi had love interest on Kannamma, when he tries to misbehave with Kannamma , she slapped him. In angry, Pandi spreaded rumours that kannamma had affair with Pandi. Later Kannamma made him to tell the truth infront of everyone in Kusthi tournament. Barathi and Pandi competed in kusthi and Barathi has won the game. Barathi was attacked by Pandi with iron rod and he had head injury and lost his memories. Whole family helped Barathi to recollect his memories but he couldn't. So, they asked help to Kannamma and finally she agreed. After trying many times, Barathi recollected his memories. Barathi received an opportunity for his higher studies in heart surgeon from an American University. While Barathi leaves Kannamma and his children, Kannamma changed her mind and accepted Barathi.  Both Barathi and Kannamma got married again. Within this the season 1 ends.

Cast

Season 1 
 Roshini Haripriyan /  Vinusha Devi as Kannamma – Shanmugam and Shenbagam's daughter; Baakiyalakshmi's step-daughter; Anjali's half-sister; Bharathi's wife; Lakshmi and Jr. Hema's mother(2019-2021) / (2022-2023)
 Arun Prasad as Dr. Bharathi – Soundarya and Venu's elder son; Shruti and Akhilan's brother; Hema's former love-interest; Kannamaa's husband; Lakshmi and Jr. Hema's father (2019–2023)
 Raksah Shyam as Lakshmi – Bharathi and Kannamma's elder daughter; Hema's twin sister (2020–2023)
 Lisha Rajkumar as Jr. Hema – Bharathi and Kannamma's younger daughter; Lakshmi's twin sister (2020-2023)
 Farina Azad as Dr. Venba – Sharmila's daughter; Bharathi's childhood friend and obsessive lover; Rohit's wife; Hema's murderer (2019-2023) 
 Roopa Sree as Soundarya – Venu's wife; Shruti, Bharathi and Akhilan's mother; Yazhini, Lakshmi, Jr. Hema and Aadhavan's grandmother (2019–2023)
Rishi Keshav as Venu Gopalakrishnan – Soundarya's husband; Shruti, Bharathi and Akhilan's father; Yazhini, Lakshmi, Jr. Hema and Aadhavan's grandfather (2019–2023)
 Kanmani Manoharan / Aruljothi Arockiaraj as Anjali – Shanmugam and Baakiyalakshmi's daughter; Kannamma's half-sister; Akhilan's wife; Aadhavan's mother<ref>{{Cite web|url=https://cinema.vikatan.com/kollywood/bharathi-kannamma-serial-actress-kanmani-interview-aval-vikatan|title=சீரியலே வேணாம்னு நினைச்சேன்!" - Serial Actress Kanmani Manoharan Interview | Aval Vikatan|first=SURYAGOMATHI|last=S,தி.ஹரிஹரன்,துரை.நாகராஜன்|website=www.vikatan.com/}}</ref> (2019-2021) / (2022-2023)
 Akilan S. Pushparaj / Sugesh Rajendran as Akhilan – Soundarya and Venu's younger son; Shruti and Bharathi's brother; Anjali's husband; Aadhavan's father (2019-2021) / (2022-2023)
 Kaavya Arivumani as Arivumani – Soundarya's niece; Shruti, Bharathi, Akhilan's cousin (2019–2021)
 Shruthi Shanmugapriya as Shruthi – Soundarya and Venu's daughter; Bharathi and Akhilan's sister; Yazhini's mother. (2019–2020)
 Sabari as Rohit – Venba's husband. (2022-2023)
 Sherin Jaanu as Thulasi – A former nurse at Bharathi's hospital, Kanamma's friend (2020–2022) 
 Deepa Shankar as Shenbagam – Shanmugam's first wife; Kannamma's mother; Lakshmi and Jr. Hema's grandmother (2019) (Dead)
 Venkatesh / Muthu Kumara Swamy as Shanmugam – Shenbagam's widower; Baakiyalakshmi's husband; Kannamma and Anjali's father; Lakshmi, Jr. Hema and Aadhavan's grandfather  (2019-2021) / (2022)
 Senthi Kumari as Baakiyalakshmi – Anbukarasi's daughter; Selva's sister; Shanmugam's second wife; Anjali's mother; Kannamma's step-mother; Aadhavan's grandmother; Lakshmi and Jr. Hema's step-grandmother (2019–2022)
 Raju Jeyamohan as Varun Mohan – A poet; Kannamma's classmate and best friend. (2019-2021)
 Alya Manasa as Dr. Hema – A cardiologist; Bharathi's colleague and former love-interest. (2019-2020) (Dead)
 Rajkumar Manoharan as Selva Ganapathy – Anbukarasi's son; Baakiyalakshmi's brother (2019–2022)
 Vijayalakshmi as Anbukarasi – Baakiyalakshmi and Selva's mother; Anjali's grandmother. (2019–2020)
 Rekha as Sharmila – Venba's mother (2019-2023)
 Bharath Kalyan as Vikram – Owner of Vikram Babu Hospital; Soundarya and Venu's colleague (2020–2022)
 Praveen Devasagayam as "Killer"  Durga – Venba's henchman (2020–2022)
 Neepa as Sumathi – Kannamaa's house owner (2021)
 Revathee Shankar as Gayatri – Venu's sister (2019–2020)
 Pushpa Vetriselvan as Santhi – Venba's housekeeper (2019–2022)
 Yogi as Maayandi – Baakiyalakshmi's henchman (2019–2022)
 Subageetha as Nirmala  – Maayandi's wife; Anjali's caretaker. (2019–2021)
 M. J. Shriram as Venba's uncle (2019–2021)
 Balaji Babu as Kumar – Kannamaa's auto-driver (2020–2022)
 Arandhangi Nisha as Advocate Vadivukkarasi aka Vadivu – Kannamma's neighbour (2021–2022)
 Thamarai Selvi as Thamarai (2022- 2023)
 Snehan as himself (2019;2023)
 Preethi Sanjeev as Vadivambal - Kannamaa's cousin (2019)
 Arunraja Kamaraj as himself – Bharathi's friend (2019)
 Manimegalai as Manimegalai – Shenbagavalli's daughter; Bharathi's proposed bride (2020)
 Uma Rani as Shenbagavalli – Soundarya's friend; Manimegalai's mother (2019–2020)
 Kaaka Muttai Shanthi Mani as Paatti (Episode 3) (2019)
 Madhumitha Illayaraja as Meenatchi - Akhilan's friend (2020)
 Madurai Mohan as Natraj – A hand carter (2020)
 Chenniamma as Petchiamma – Natraj's wife (2020)
 Rohini as Veni – An owner in petrol bunk (2020)
 Jeya Lakshmi – An incharge in an orphanage (2020)
 Vasu Vikram as Mahalingam – Kannamma's MD in a tailoring departmental store (2020)
 Babitha as Maheshwari Mahalingam – Soundarya's friend; Mahalingam's wife (2020)
 Yuvan Pattison as Prasad – Bharathi's friend; Mahalingam and Maheshwari's son (2020)
 KPY Pazhani as Pazhani – Kannamma's neighbour (2020)
 Nilani as Seetha – Pazhani's wife; Kannamma's friend based in Thiruvallur (2020)
 Jeyanthi as an IAS officer (2021)
 Salma Arun as Dr. Priya – Bharathi's friend (2021)
 Aari Arujunan as himself (2021)
 Sivaangi Krishnakumar as herself (2021)
 Suresh Chakravarty as himself (2021)
 KPY Bala as himself (2021)
 Archana Chandhoke as herself (2021)
 Sona Nair as a Judge of Court (2021)
 Nakshatra Nagesh as Saraswathi (2022)
 Sasilaya as IPS Sasikala (2022)
 Ajay Ratnam as Police IG (during terrorists hijacks hospital) (2022)
 RJ Balaji as himself (2023)
 Shivin Ganesan as herself (2023)

 Spin-off
 

In 6 February 2023, the series completion of 4 years, a spin-off introduced with the same title, premiered on 6 February 2023 starring Sibbu Suryan as Bharathi while Vinusha Devi as Kannamma. Along with Roopa Sree and Deepa Shankar in the supporting roles.

Production
 Soundtrack 

 
Soundtrack

Filming
Due to the COVID-19 pandemic, Bharathi Kannamma, and all other Indian television series and films production were suspended on 19 March 2020. Three months later, shooting was permitted and the team commenced filming in July. The show commenced telecasting new episodes from 27 July 2020. With the increase in Covid cases in Tamil Nadu, production was again suspended for a few days in mid-May 2021.

Crossover episodes
In January 2020, Bharathi Kannamma had a crossover with Pandian Stores for a week. It also had a crossover with Raja Rani 2 during March 2021 for three weeks and a day (Raja Rani S2 E-108 to E-126). With the suspension in mid-May 2021 and with a few cast availability then for bank episodes, the series crossed over with Raja Rani 2. Again in 2022, the series joined Mahasangamam with Raja Rani 2

Adaptations

Reception
Viewership and ratings
Beginning with an average viewership and trp of 5.53, after a year, In September 2020, the sequence of the series where lead Kannamma leaves the house, the series gained viewership and entering top five Tamil television programs. In week 37 of 2020, it became the third-most watched Tamil soap for the first time, garnering 8.254 million impressions and the second Star Vijay program to enter the top five. However, in week 21 of 2021 when the rival channel Sun TV's top rated soap Roja'' shifted against Bharathi Kannamma. During Week 32, Bharathi Kannamma defeated Roja by a margin of 2TVR across Urban and Urban+Rural markets, repeatedly leading in the slot.

Spin-off

Bharathi Kannamma 2 

It premiered on Star Vijay on 6 February 2023 From Monday to Saturday at 21:00 and is also available on the digital platform on Disney+ Hotstar.

See also
 Bharathi Kannamma 2

References

External links
 Official website at Hotstar
 

Star Vijay original programming
Tamil-language romance television series
Tamil-language melodrama television series
2019 Tamil-language television series debuts
Tamil-language television shows
2023 Tamil-language television series endings
Television shows set in Tamil Nadu
Tamil-language television series based on Malayalam-language television series